The 1919 Copa Aldao was the final match to decide the winner of the Copa Aldao, the 5th. edition of the international competition organised by the Argentine and Uruguayan Associations together. The final was contested by Uruguayan Nacional and Argentine Boca Juniors.

In the match, played at Estadio Gran Parque Central in Montevideo on May 16, 1920, Nacional beat Boca Juniors 3–0, winning its second Copa Aldao trophy.

Qualified teams

Overview

It was the first Copa Aldao final contested by Boca Juniors as champion of Primera División, while Nacional played its third final having been winner of the 2nd. edition played in 1916. 1919 was one of the most successful seasons in the history of Boca Juniors so the club won the Copa de Competencia Jockey Club, Copa Ibarguren, and international Tie Cup (won to Nacional). Nevertheless, this edition of Copa Aldao would be the only final lost by Boca Juniors in the season.

On 15 minutes, Héctor Scarone headed to score the first goal. Only five minutes later, Ángel Romano scored another goal for Nacional, and Pascual Somma scored the third goal on 61 minutes. As a curious fact, Nacional played almost the entire game with 10 players due to Rogelio Naguil left the field on 22 after being injured (substitutions were not allowed on those times).

With this win over Boca Juniors, Uruguayan side Nacional achieved its second Copa Aldao trophy.

Match details 

Notes

References

1920 in Argentine football
1920 in Uruguayan football
A
a
Football in Montevideo